"More Than My Hometown" is a song co-written and recorded by American country music singer Morgan Wallen. It was released on May 27, 2020 as the lead-off single from his second studio album Dangerous: The Double Album.

Content
Wallen co-wrote "More Than My Hometown" with Michael Hardy, Ernest Keith Smith, and Ryan Vojtesak, and it was produced by Joey Moi. Lyrically, the song talks about small town love and finds the narrator drawing the line at moving away from his hometown to follow his girlfriend's big city dreams ("This might be the last time I get to lay you down, 'cause I can't love you more than my hometown").

Music video
The music video was directed by Justin Clough and premiered on August 24, 2020. The video was filmed in Ashland City, Tennessee. Starring in the video is Morgan Wallen and a female from the bachelor .

Cover photo
The photograph used as the cover image for the single was taken looking southbound on Tennessee Highway 70 just north of Kyles Ford, Tennessee. 
One of the towns listed on the highway sign in the photo, Sneedville, is the actual native hometown of Morgan Wallen.

Charts

Weekly charts

Year-end charts

Certifications

Release history

References

2020 singles
Country ballads
2020s ballads
Morgan Wallen songs
Songs written by Hardy (singer)
Songs written by Morgan Wallen
Songs written by Ernest (musician)
Song recordings produced by Joey Moi
Big Loud singles